Nikolai Sergeyevich Kildishev (born 2 December 1982) is a former Russian professional football player.

Club career
He played in the Russian Football National League for FC Metallurg-Kuzbass Novokuznetsk in 2007.

References

External links
 

1982 births
Living people
Russian footballers
Association football defenders
FC Sokol Saratov players
FC Novokuznetsk players
FC Nosta Novotroitsk players